This is a list of women artists who were born in Italy or whose artworks are closely associated with that country.

A
Carla Accardi (1924–2014), abstractionist painter
Eleonora Aguiari (born 1973), installation artist
Angelica Veronica Airola (c.1590–1670), Baroque painter
Quirina Alippi-Fabretti (1849–1919), painter
Topazia Alliata (1913–2015), painter, writer
Edina Altara (1898–1983), illustrator, decorator and fashion designer
Giulia Andreani (born 1985), history painter
Amalia de Angelis (fl. 1851–1871), painter
Elena Anguissola (c.1532–1584), painter and nun
Lucia Anguissola (c.1538–c.1565), painter
Sofonisba Anguissola (c.1532–1625), Renaissance painter
Anna Maria Arduino (1633–1700), 17th century painter and writer and the Princess of Piombino from Messina, Sicily
Simona Atzori (born 1974), painter and dancer born without arms

B
Pippa Bacca (1974–2008), artist
Bianca Bagnarelli (born 1988), Italian-French illustrator, writer
Maria Maddalena Baldacci (1718–1782), painter
Rosa Barba (born 1972), installation artist
Eleonora Bargili (18th century), pastellist
Letizia Battaglia (born 1935), photographer
Vanessa Beecroft (born 1969), contemporary artist
Aniella di Beltrano (1613–1649), Baroque painter
Elisabetta Benato-Beltrami (1813–1888), painter, sculptor
Daniela Benedini (born 1972), contemporary painter  
Mirella Bentivoglio (1922–2017), sculptor, poet, performance artist
Laura Bernasconi (fl.1674), Baroque painter
Rosalba Bernini (1762–1829), pastellist
Antonia Bertucci-Pinelli (died c.1640), Baroque painter
Carlotta de Bevilacqua (born 1957), lighting designer 
Rossella Biscotti (born 1978), visual artist, video maker
Ernesta Legnani Bisi (1788–1859), painter and engraver
Fulvia Bisi (1818–1911), painter 
Rita Boley Bolaffio (1898–1995), collage artist
Clelia Bompiani (1848–1927), painter
Monica Bonvicini (born 1965), sculptor, photographer, video artist, educator
Giuseppina Quaglia Borghese (1765–1831), painter and pastellist
Erma Bossi (1875-1952), painter
Luigia Bozzini (19th century), religious painter
Faustina Bracci Armellini (1785–1857), pastellist
Antonietta Brandeis  (1848–1926), painter
Nina Breeder (born 1982), contemporary artist
Plautilla Bricci (1616–1690), architect, painter
Eufrasia Burlamacchi (1482–1548), manuscript illuminator
Angiola Guglielma Butteri (17th century), nun, painter

C
Orsola Maddalena Caccia (1596–1676), nun, religious painter
Margherita Caffi (1650–1710), flower painter 
Maria Callani (1778–1803), 18th century portrait painter, active in Parma.
Suor Prudenza Cambi (died 1601), painter and nun
Milena Canonero (born 1946), costume designer
Ginevra Cantofoli (1618–1672), Baroque painter
Sister Luisa Capomazza (c.1600–1646), painter
Benedetta Cappa (1897–1977), futurist artist
Antonella Cappuccio (born 1944), costume designer
Ghitta Carell (1899–1972), Hungarian-born Italian photographer
Marianna Carlevarijs (1703–1750), painter and pastellist
Rosalba Carriera (1673–1757), painter 
Maria Vittoria Cassana (died 1711), painter
Caterina Amigoni Castellini (18th century), pastellist
Beatrice Catanzaro (born 1975), conceptual artist
Catherine of Bologna (1413–1463), nun, artist, saint
Nicoletta Ceccoli (born 1973), San Marinian illustrator
Giulia Centurelli (1832–1872), painter and poet
Maria Suppioti Ceroni (1730–c.1773), pastellist
Vittoria Chierici (born 1955), painter
Caterina Cherubini (died 1811), miniaturist
Amalia Ciardi Dupré (born 1934), sculptor and painter
Emma Ciardi (1879–1933), painter 
Vittoria Cocito (1891–1971), painter and illustrator
Marina Cicogna (born 1934), film producer and photographer
Barbara Ciardo (born 1983), comic book colorist
Maria Giovanna Clementi (1692–1761), portrait painter
Daniela Comani (born 1965), multimedia artist
Theresa Maria Coriolano (1620–1671), engraver
Maddalena Corvina (1607–1664), painter and engraver
Liliana Cossovel (1924–1984), painter, collagist 
Maria Cosway (1760–1838), Italian-English painter
Mariangiola Criscuolo (c.1548–1630), Renaissance painter
Maria Eufrasia della Croce (1597–1676), nun, painter

D
Dadamaino (1930–2004), painter 
Isabella Maria dal Pozzo (fl. 1660s), painter
Teodora Danti (c.1498–c.1573), painter, writer
Caterina Davinio (born 1957), poet, novelist, new media artist
Elena de' Grimani (born 1975), comic book artist and illustrator
Yvonne De Rosa (born 1975), photographer
Marianna Candidi Dionigi (1756–1826), painter and writer
Anna Vittoria Dolara (1754–1827), nun, poet, painter
Agnese Dolci (1635–1686), painter
Valentina D'Urbano (born 1985), writer and illustrator
Irene Parenti Duclos (1754–1795), painter, poet
Amalia Ciardi Duprè (born 1934), sculptor, painter

F
Adriana Bisi Fabbri (1881–1918), painter
Orsola Faccioli (1823–1906), painter 
Lucrina Fetti (c.1590–1651), painter
Teresa Fioroni-Voigt (1799–1880), painter of miniatures
Eva Fischer (1920–2015), Croatian-born Italian painter and engraver
Lavinia Fontana (1552–1614), early professional female painter
Giovanna Fratellini (1666–1731), Baroque painter
Virginia von Fürstenberg (born 1974), fashion designer

G
Margarita Gabassi (mid-18th century), painter
Anna Galeotti (1739–1773), engraver, painter
Fede Galizia (1578–1630), pioneering still life Renaissance painter
Federica Galli (1932–2009), printmaker
Giola Gandini (1906–1941), painter
Giovanna Garzoni (1600–1670), Baroque painter 
Francesca Genna (born 1967), printmaker 
Artemisia Gentileschi (1593–c.1656), Baroque painter
Costanza Ghilini (1754–1775), amateur painter and pastellist
Caterina Ginnasi (1590–1660), Baroque painter
Domiziana Giordano (born 1959), painter, actress, photographer and video artist
Sofia Giordano (1778–1829), painter
Gisella Giovenco (born 1946), painter and stylist
Francesca Grilli (born 1978), visual artist, video maker
Beatrice Ancillotti Goretti (1879–1937), painter
Rosina Mantovani Gutti (1851–1943), painter, especially of children

H
Domitilla Harding (fl. late 20th, early 21st century), furniture and fashion designer, also works with glass
 Adelita Husni-Bey (born 1985), visual artist, video maker

I
Iaia (116–27 BC), Roman painter, engraver

K
Elisabetta Keller (1891–1969), Italian-born Swiss painter and pastellist
Kiyohara Tama (1861–1939), Japanese painter active in Sicily
Elisa Koch (1833–1914), painter, pastellist

L
Giulia Lama (born 1681), painter
Luisa Lambri (born 1969), photographer
Ketty La Rocca (1938–1976), poet, visual artist
Carla Lavatelli (1928–2006), portrait painter, abstract sculptor
Bice Lazzari (1900–1981), painter
Angelica Le Gru Perotti (1719–1776), painter
Vittoria Ligari (1713–1783), painter
Maria Cattarina Locatelli (died 1723), painter
Barbara Longhi (1552–1638), painter

M
Ortensia Poncarale Maggi (1732–1811), painter
Francesca Magliani (born 1845), painter
Lilla Maldura (fl. 1876–1887), painter
Matilde Malenchini (1779–1858), portrait and genre painter 
Ada Mangilli (born 1863), painter
Anna Morandi Manzolini (1714–1774), anatomist, wax modeler
Faustina Maratti (c.1679–1745), Baroque poet, painter
Elisabetta Marchioni (fl. 1700), Venetian painter
Clementina Marcovigi (born 1863), painter 
Virginia Mariani (1824–1898), painter, ceramist
Maria Martinetti (1864–1921), painter
Luigia Massari (1810–1898), painter, embroiderer
Giulia Masucci Fava (born 1858), painter
Isabella Discalzi Mazzoni (fl. late 15th century), sculptor
Margherita Pavesi Mazzoni (1930–2010), painter, sculptor and poet
Carla Carli Mazzucato (born 1935), contemporary artist
Marisa Merz (1931–2019), sculptor
Giovanna Tacconi Messini (1717–1742), painter
Madonna Fitta de Milano (17th century), painter
Otonella Mocellin (born 1966), photographer and video artist
Tina Modotti (1896–1942), photographer, model and actress
Maria Molin (18th century), pastellist
Eleonora Monti (1727–1760), painter
Sandra Moreschi (born 1946), designer of Jewish ceremonial art
Emma Moretto (19th century), painter
Marisa Mori (1900–1985), Futurist painter and printmaker
Valentina Murabito (born 1981), photographer, visual artist

N
Olga Napoli (1903–1955), painter
Maria Giacomina Nazari (born 1724), painter
Plautilla Nelli (1524–1588), nun, early female Renaissance painter 
Dianora Niccolini (born 1936), photographer
Elena Nobili (1833–1900), figure painter
Lila De Nobili (1916–2002), stage designer, costume designer and fashion illustrator
Teresa Boccardi Nuytz (died 1837), pastellist

O
Virginia Oldoini (1837–1899), photographer
Maria Ormani (1428–c.1470), manuscript illustrator and nun
Giuseppina Osenga (19th-century), painter
Valentina Guidi Ottobri (artist) (born 1988), artist, curator

P
Arcangela Paladini (1599–1622), painter 
Isabella Parasole (c.1570–c.1620), wood engraver
Luigia Pascoli (1805–1882), painter
Francesca Pasquali (born 1980), painter
Rosalba Pedrina (born 1944), painter and teacher
Itala Pellegrino (born 1865), painter
Cinzia Pellin (born 1973), artist
Lida Persili (19th century), painter
Anna Bacherini Piattoli (1720–1788), painter
Fanny Pieroni-Davenport (late 19th century), painter 
Isabella Piccini (1664–1732), engraver
Sara Pichelli (born 1983), comics artist
Margherita Pillini (late 19th century), painter
Ida Pinto-Sezzi (born 1852), painter
Laura Piranesi (1755–1785), engraver
Paola Pivi (born 1971), multimedia artist
Teresa del Po (1649–1716), painter 
Amalia Del Ponte (born 1936), multidisciplinary artist
Carlotta Ida Popert (1848–1923), German-Italian painter, etcher
Isabella Maria dal Pozzo (died 1700), painter

R
Rabarama (born 1969), contemporary artist
Baroness Annetta Radovska (19th century), painter
Suor Barbara Ragnoni (15th century), nun, painter
Elvira Raimondi (1866–1920), painter
Carol Rama (1918–2015), painter
Maria Angelica Razzi (16th century), nun, sculptor
Emma Gaggiotti Richards (1825–1912), painter
Elisa Rigutini Bulle (born 1859), painter
Marietta Robusti (c.1560–1590), Renaissance painter
Linda Rocchi (born 1857), painter 
Francesca Rognoni-Gratognini (born 1850), landscape painter
Juana Romani (1869–1924), painter
Lalla Romano (1906–2001), novelist, poet, painter and journalist
Paola Romano (born 1951), painter and sculptor
Diana de Rosa (1602–1643), painter
Vicenza Giovanna Rovisi (1750–1824), late Baroque and Neoclassical painter

S
Marina Sagona (born 1967), Italian-American artist
Chiara Samugheo (1935–2022), photographer
Felicità Sartori (c.1714–1760), painter and pastellist
Beatrice Scaccia (born 1978), painter
Maria Domenica Scanferla (1726–1763), painter and pastellist 
Teresa Scannabecchi (1662–1708), Baroque painter 
Lucrezia Scarfaglia (fl. 1677), painter
Ida Botti Scifoni (1812–1844), painter, sculptor and designer
Diana Scultori (born 1535), engraver
Marinella Senatore (born 1977), visual artist
Floria Sigismondi (born 1965), Italian-Canadian photographer
Luisa Silei (1825–1898), landscape painter 
Roberta Silva (born 1971), Trinidad and Tobago-born contemporary artist
Nerina Simi (1890–1987), painter, art teacher
Elisabetta Sirani (1638–1665), Baroque painter
Violante Beatrice Siries (1709–1783), painter
Maria Spanò (born 1843), painter 
Irene di Spilimbergo (1540–1559), Renaissance painter
Chiara Spinelli (1744–1823), pastellist
Francesca Stuart Sindici (1858–c.1929), Spanish-Italian painter

T
Patrizia Taddei (born 1948), Italian-born Sammarinese contemporary artist
Celeste Tanfani (fl. 1735), pastellist
Margherita Terzi (18th century), pastellist
Caterina Tarabotti (active 1659), Baroque painter
Maria Felice Tibaldi (born 1707), painter
Grazia Toderi (born 1963), video artist and photographer
Lucia Casalini Torelli (1677–1762), painter
Tatiana Trouvé (born 1968), contemporary artist

V
Anna Maria Vaiani (died c.1655), engraver
Grazia Varisco (born 1937), visual artist
Chiara Varotari (1584–1663), Baroque painter
Virginia Vezzi (1601–1638), painter
Lella Vignelli (1934–2016), designer
Lauretta Vinciarelli (1943–2011), artist, architect, educator
Teresa Berenice Vitelli (fl. 1706–1729), painter

W
Bettina Werner (born 1965), artist working with salt

Z
Maria Zacchè (born 1933), artist specializing in pen and ink drawings
Gentile Zanardi (late 17th century), Baroque painter
Silvia Ziche (born 1967), comic book artist and writer

-
Italian women artists, List of
Artists
Artists